Joseph Lewis Stortini (born December 4, 1932) is an American restauranteer, educator, and politician in the state of Washington. He served the 27th district from 1969 to 1977.

Early life
Stortini was born in Tacoma, Washington, to Giuseppe Stortini and Giuseppina Piazza, both Italian immigrants. Stortini's father immigrated from Porto Sant'Elpidio, Fermo in 1914. His mother was born in Domanico, Calabria in 1909. His parents met and eventually settled in Tacoma's 5th ward, which at the time was made up of predominately southern European immigrants. During his early years in Tacoma's hilltop neighborhoods, he developed a passion for athletics. He attended University of Puget Sound, where he played both football and baseball. After graduating with a degree in education, he went on to Oregon State University, receiving a master's degree in education.

Career
Stortini started his career as a public high school teacher in the Tacoma Public School district, where he worked from 1955 to 1975. In the late 1980s, he opened the Mama Stortini's restaurant, which he later sold. In 1984, Stortini was elected Pierce County Executive.

Stortini served two terms in the state Senate, two terms on the Pierce County Board of County Commissioners, and was elected twice as county executive.

Stortini opened the Joeseppi's Italian restaurant in November 2005.

Affair and wrongful-death suit

Stortini's affair with his employee, Susan Webstad, was brought to light when he made a 911 call after she overdosed. A wrongful-death suit against Stortini by her estate was dismissed, with the appeals court finding that "Washington law provides no general duty to protect others from self-inflicted harm."

References

Living people
1932 births
Pierce County Councillors
University of Puget Sound alumni
Oregon State University alumni
Democratic Party Washington (state) state senators
Educators from Washington (state)
Politicians from Tacoma, Washington
American people of Italian descent